Atopic dermatitis (AD), also known as atopic eczema, is a long-term type of inflammation of the skin (dermatitis). It results in itchy, red, swollen, and cracked skin. Clear fluid may come from the affected areas, which often thickens over time. While the condition may occur at any age, it typically starts in childhood, with changing severity over the years. In children under one year of age, much of the body may be affected. As children get older, the areas on the insides of the knees and elbows are most commonly affected. In adults, the hands and feet are most commonly affected. Scratching the affected areas worsens the symptoms, and those affected have an increased risk of skin infections. Many people with atopic dermatitis develop hay fever or asthma.

The cause is unknown but believed to involve genetics, immune system dysfunction, environmental exposures, and difficulties with the permeability of the skin. If one identical twin is affected, the other has an 85% chance of having the condition. Those who live in cities and dry climates are more commonly affected. Exposure to certain chemicals or frequent hand washing makes symptoms worse. While emotional stress may make the symptoms worse, it is not a cause. The disorder is not contagious. A diagnosis is typically based on the signs and symptoms. Other diseases that must be excluded before making a diagnosis include contact dermatitis, psoriasis, and seborrheic dermatitis.

Treatment involves avoiding things that make the condition worse, daily bathing with application of a moisturising cream afterwards, applying steroid creams when flares occur, and medications to help with itchiness. Things that commonly make it worse include wool clothing, soaps, perfumes, chlorine, dust, and cigarette smoke. Phototherapy may be useful in some people. Steroid pills or creams based on calcineurin inhibitors may occasionally be used if other measures are not effective. Antibiotics (either by mouth or topically) may be needed if a bacterial infection develops. Dietary changes are only needed if food allergies are suspected.

Atopic dermatitis affects about 20% of people at some point in their lives. It is more common in younger children. Females are slightly more affected than males. Many people outgrow the condition. Atopic dermatitis is sometimes called eczema, a term that also refers to a larger group of skin conditions. Other names include "infantile eczema", "flexural eczema", "prurigo Besnier", "allergic eczema", and "neurodermatitis".

Signs and symptoms 

People with AD often have dry and scaly skin that spans the entire body, except perhaps the diaper area, and intensely itchy red, splotchy, raised lesions to form in the bends of the arms or legs, face, and neck.

AD commonly affects the eyelids, where signs such as Dennie-Morgan infraorbital fold, infra-auricular fissure, and periorbital pigmentation can be seen. Postinflammatory hyperpigmentation on the neck gives the classic "dirty neck" appearance. Lichenification, excoriation, and erosion or crusting on the trunk may indicate secondary infection. Flexural distribution with ill-defined edges with or without hyperlinearity on the wrist, finger knuckles, ankle, feet, and hands are also commonly seen.

Causes 

The cause of AD is not known, although  some evidence indicates genetic, environmental, and immunologic factors.

Climate
Low humidity, and low temperature increase the prevalence and risk of flares in patients with atopic dermatitis.

Genetics 
Many people with AD have a family history or a personal history of atopy. Atopy is an immediate-onset allergic reaction (type-1 hypersensitivity reaction mediated by IgE) that may manifest as asthma, food allergies, AD, or hay fever. Up to 80% of people with atopic dermatitis have elevated total or allergen-specific IgE levels.

About 30% of people with atopic dermatitis have mutations in the gene for the production of filaggrin (FLG), which increase the risk for early onset of atopic dermatitis and developing asthma.

Hygiene hypothesis 
According to the hygiene hypothesis, early childhood exposure to certain microorganisms (such as gut flora and helminth parasites) protects against allergic diseases by contributing to the development of the immune system. This exposure is limited in a modern "sanitary" environment, and the incorrectly developed immune system is prone to develop allergies to harmless substances.

Some support exists for this hypothesis with respect to AD. Those exposed to dogs while growing up have a lower risk of atopic dermatitis. Also, epidemiological studies support a protective role for helminths against AD. Likewise, children with poor hygiene are at a lower risk for developing AD, as are children who drink unpasteurized milk.

Allergens 
In a small percentage of cases, atopic dermatitis is caused by sensitization to foods. Also, exposure to allergens, either from food or the environment, can exacerbate existing atopic dermatitis. Exposure to dust mites, for example, is believed to contribute to one's risk of developing AD. A diet high in fruits seems to have a protective effect against AD, whereas the opposite seems true for fast foods. Atopic dermatitis sometimes appears associated with celiac disease and nonceliac gluten sensitivity, and the improvement with a gluten-free diet (GFD) indicates that gluten is a causative agent in these cases.

Role of Staphylococcus aureus
Colonization of the skin by the bacterium S. aureus is extremely prevalent in those with atopic dermatitis.  Abnormalities in the skin barrier of persons with AD are exploited by S. aureus to trigger cytokine expression, thus aggravating the condition.

Hard water 
Atopic dermatitis in children may be linked to the level of calcium carbonate or "hardness" of household water, when used to drink. So far, these findings have been supported in children from the United Kingdom, Spain, and Japan.

Pathophysiology
Excessive type 2 inflammation underlies the pathophysiology of atopic dermatitis.

Disruption of the epidermal barrier is thought to play an integral role in the pathogenesis of AD. Disruptions of the epidermal barrier allows allergens to penetrate the epidermis to deeper layers of the skin. This leads to activation of epidermal inflammatory dendritic and innate lymphoid cells which subsequently attracts Th2 CD4+ helper T cells to the skin. This dysregulated Th2 inflammatory response is thought to lead to the eczematous lesions. The Th2 helper T cells become activated, leading to the release of inflammatory cytokines including IL-4, IL-13 and IL-31 which activate downstream Janus kinase (Jak) pathways. The active Jak pathways lead to inflammation and downstream activation of plasma cells and B lymphocytes which release antigen specific IgE contributing to further inflammation. Other CD4+ helper T-cell pathways thought to be involved in atopic dermatitis inflammation include the Th1, Th17, and Th22 pathways. Some specific CD4+ helper T-cell inflammatory pathways are more commonly activated in specific ethnic groups with AD (for example, the Th-2 and Th-17 pathways are commonly activated in Asian people) possibly explaining the differences in phenotypic presentation of atopic dermatitis in specific populations.

Mutations in the filaggrin gene, FLG, also cause impairment in the skin barrier that contributes to the pathogenesis of AD. Filaggrin is produced by epidermal skin cells (keratinocytes) in the horny layer of the epidermis. Filaggrin stimulates skin cells to release moisturizing factors and lipid matrix material, which cause adhesion of adjacent keratinocytes and contributes to the skin barrier. A loss-of-function mutation of filaggrin causes loss of this lipid matrix and external moisturizing factors, subsequently leading to disruption of the skin barrier. The disrupted skin barrier leads to transdermal water loss (leading to the xerosis or dry skin commonly seen in AD) and antigen and allergen penetration of the epidermal layer. Filaggrin mutations are also associated with a decrease in natural antimicrobial peptides found on the skin; subsequently leading to disruption of skin flora and bacterial overgrowth (commonly Staphylococcus aureus overgrowth or colonization).

Atopic dermatitis is also associated with the release of pruritogens (molecules that stimulate pruritus or itching) in the skin. Keratinocytes, mast cells, eosinophils and T-cells release pruritogens in the skin; leading to activation of Aδ fibers and Group C nerve fibers in the epidermis and dermis contributing to sensations of pruritus and pain. The pruritogens include the Th2 cytokines IL-4, IL-13, IL-31, histamine, and various neuropeptides. Mechanical stimulation from scratching lesions can also lead to the release of pruritogens contributing to the itch scratch cycle whereby there is increased pruritus or itch after scratching a lesion. Chronic scratching of lesions can cause thickening or lichenification of the skin or prurigo nodularis (generalized nodules that are severely itchy).

Diagnosis 
AD is typically diagnosed clinically, meaning it is based on signs and symptoms alone, without special testing. Several different criteria developed for research have also been validated to aid in diagnosis. Of these, the UK Diagnostic Criteria, based on the work of Hanifin and Rajka, has been the most widely validated.

Treatments 
No cure for AD is known, although treatments may reduce the severity and frequency of flares.

Humidity
A humidifier can be used to prevent low indoor humidity during winter (especially with indoor heating), and dry season. And a dehumidifier can be used during seasons with excessive humidity.

Applying moisturisers may prevent the skin from drying out and decrease the need for other medications. Affected persons often report that improvement of skin hydration parallels with improvement in AD symptoms.

Daily basic care is intended to stabilize the barrier function of the skin to mitigate its sensitivity to irritation and penetration of allergens. Depending on the condition of the skin, ointments and lotions are usually used. Their composition depends on the current skin condition: oil-in-water emulsions are usually used, but water-in-oil emulsions are also used for very dry skin.

Lifestyle
Health professionals often recommend that persons with AD bathe regularly in lukewarm baths, especially in salt water, to moisten their skin. Avoiding woolen clothing is usually good for those with AD. Likewise silk, silver-coated clothing may help. Dilute bleach baths have also been reported effective at managing AD.

Diet
The role of vitamin D on atopic dermatitis is not clear, but some evidence shows that vitamin D supplementation may improve its symptoms.

There is some evidence linking Vitamin B12 blood levels to the severity of atopic dermatitis (AD), with a potentially clinically significant improvement observed following Vitamin B12 oral supplementation. However, more research is required to confirm the cause-effect relationship between Vitamin B12 deficiency and AD severity or relapse.

Studies have investigated the role of long-chain polyunsaturated fatty acid (LCPUFA) supplementation and LCPUFA status in the prevention and treatment of AD, but the results are controversial. Whether the nutritional intake of n-3 fatty acids has a clear preventive or therapeutic role, or if n-6 fatty acids consumption promotes atopic diseases is unclear.

Several probiotics seem to have a positive effect, with a roughly 20% reduction in the rate of AD. The best evidence is for multiple strains of bacteria.

In people with celiac disease or nonceliac gluten sensitivity, a gluten-free diet improves their symptoms and prevents the occurrence of new outbreaks.

Medication

Topical corticosteroids, such as hydrocortisone, have proven effective in managing AD. If topical corticosteroids and moisturisers fail, short-term treatment with topical calcineurin inhibitors such as tacrolimus or pimecrolimus may be tried, although their use is controversial, as some studies indicate that they increase the risk of developing skin cancer or lymphoma. A 2007 meta-analysis showed that topical pimecrolimus is not as effective as corticosteroids and tacrolimus. A 2015 meta-analysis, though, indicated that topical tacrolimus and pimecrolimus are more effective than low-dose topical corticosteroids, and found no evidence for increased risk of malignancy or skin atrophy. In 2016, crisaborole, an inhibitor of PDE-4, was approved as a topical treatment for mild-to-moderate eczema.

Other medications used for AD include systemic immunosuppressants such as ciclosporin, methotrexate, interferon gamma-1b, mycophenolate mofetil, and azathioprine. Antidepressants and naltrexone may be used to control pruritus (itchiness). Leukotriene inhibitors such as monteleukast are of unclear benefit as of 2018.

In 2017, the monoclonal antibody(mAb) dupilumab under the trade name Dupixent was approved to treat moderate-to-severe eczema.
In 2021, an additional monoclonal antibody, tralokinumab, was approved in the EU & UK with the trade name Adtralza then later in the US as Adbry for similarly severe cases. Another monoclonal antibody treatment, lebrikizumab, is in phase 3 trials in the US; the drug has been granted Fast Track Designation by the FDA, and Eli Lilly and Company is expected to apply for FDA approval of the drug in the second half of 2022.

Some JAK inhibitors such as abrocitinib, trade name Cibinquo, and upadacitinib, trade name Rinvoq, have been approved in the US for the treatment of moderate-to-severe eczema as of January 2022.

Tentative, low-quality evidence indicates that allergy immunotherapy is effective in AD. This treatment consists of a series of injections or drops under the tongue of a solution containing the allergen.

Antibiotics, either by mouth or applied topically, are commonly used to target overgrowth of S. aureus in the skin of people with AD, but a 2019 meta-analysis found no clear evidence of benefit. The anti-inflammatory mechanism of action of this treatment is new and differs fundamentally from UV therapies by the lack of direct immunosuppression of the skin. Controlled studies on the treatment of atopic dermatitis with such long-wave light ("light vaccination") are not available.

Light
A more novel form of treatment involves exposure to broad- or narrow-band ultraviolet (UV) light. UV radiation exposure has been found to have a localized immunomodulatory effect on affected tissues and may be used to decrease the severity and frequency of flares. In particular, the usage of UVA1 is more effective in treating acute flares, whereas narrow-band UVB is more effective in long-term management scenarios. However, UV radiation has also been implicated in various types of skin cancer, and thus UV treatment is not without risk. UV phototherapy is not indicated in young adults and children due to this risk of skin cancer with prolonged use or exposure.

Treatment with pulsed blue light (400-500 nm, 29 J/cm²) resulted in a more than 50% decrease in inflammation score (EASI) and consumption of topical corticosteroids after 6 months in a study of 36 patients with severe atopic dermatitis. In atopic hand eczema, inflammation was inhibited in a single-blind side-by-side comparison study of 10 patients 6 months after the end of treatment. In contrast to UV irradiation, there was not a decrease but an increase in lymphocytes and Langerhans cells.

Alternative medicine
While  several Chinese herbal medicines are intended for treating atopic eczema,  no conclusive evidence shows that these treatments, taken by mouth or applied topically, reduce the severity of eczema in children or adults.

Epidemiology 

Since the beginning of the 20th century, many inflammatory skin disorders have become more common; AD is a classic example of such a disease. It now affects 15–30% of children and 2–10% of adults in developed countries, and in the United States has nearly tripled in the past 30–40 years. Over 15 million American adults and children have AD.

Society and culture

Conspiracy theories 
A number of false and conspiratorial claims about AD have emerged on the internet and have been amplified by social media. These conspiracy theories include, among others, claims that AD is caused by 5G, formaldehyde in food, vaccines, dust, and topical steroids. Various conspiracy theories also claim that vegan diets, apple cider vinegar, calendula, and witch hazel can cure AD and that air purifiers reduce the risk of developing AD.

Research
Evidence suggests that IL-4 is central in the pathogenesis of AD. Therefore, a rationale exists for targeting IL-4 with IL-4 inhibitors. People with atopic dermatitis are more likely to have Staphylococcus aureus living on them. The role this plays in pathogenesis is yet to be determined.

See also 
 Sweat allergy

References

External links 

 NIH Handout on Health: Atopic Dermatitis
 Eczema Care Online
 Moisturiser Decision Aid . University of Bristol.

 
Type I hypersensitivity
Steroid-responsive inflammatory conditions
Wikipedia medicine articles ready to translate
Wikipedia emergency medicine articles ready to translate